Meleager is a bronze sculpture of the mythological figure Meleager by the Italian Renaissance sculptor Pier Jacopo Alari Bonacolsi, known by his contemporaries as L'Antico, and to art history as "Antico".. The sculpture is now in the Victoria and Albert Museum in London.

The sculpture

The sculpture was made  in Mantua in Italy, by the leading sculptor Pier Jacopo Alari Bonacolsi, known by his contemporaries as L'Antico. It is in cast bronze, part-gilded and with silver inlaid eyes.

It shows the mythological figure of Meleager, who was the heir to the throne of Calydon, a city in Greece. The goddess Artemis was offended by Meleager's father, Oeneus, and so she sent a monstrous boar to attack the fields that supplied the city with food. Meleager is shown in the sculpture poised with a weapon about to spear the boar. The weapon is part-missing, broken at some time in the past, and the boar is completely missing - it may never have been part of the sculpture as the base has no space to accommodate it.

The design is known to have been based on a classical marble statue. At one time this marble was in the Renaissance Belvedere in Rome. By 1638 it was displayed in the Uffizi in Florence, where it was known as the "Contadino" or "Villano" ("the peasant"). The marble statue was destroyed on 12 August 1762 by a fire and resulting partial roof collapse at the Uffizi.

Meleager is probably the "figure of metal called the little peasant" ("il villanello") listed in an inventory dated to 1496. This list of possessions was made following the death of Gianfrancesco Gonzaga of Bozzolo, the third son of Marchese Ludovico Gonzaga of Mantua. L'Antico was court artist to three generations of the Gonzaga family.

Recent history
The sculpture was bought "on a hunch" by the art dealer Horace Baxter at "an obscure auction" in Kent for £16. He took the sculpture to the Victoria and Albert Museum, where it was immediately recognised by the curator and art historian John Pope-Hennessy as a major Renaissance work. Baxter sold the sculpture to the V&A Museum in 1960 for £4,000, a little under the then market value.

The sculpture was featured in the second episode of the BBC series Secrets of the Museum, first shown in March 2020, which looked at behind-the-scenes work on the collections of the V&A Museum. It showed how it has to be kept under very strict environmental conditions as the bronze is suffering from bronze disease.

Gallery

References

Further reading
Allison, Ann Hersey. 1994. The Bronzes of Pier Jacopo Alari Bonacolsi called Antico, Vienna, pp. 49–50, 60, 167-171 (V&A version, pp. 168–171), ill. p. 167, 8.
Baker, Malcolm & Brenda Richardson (eds). 1999. A Grand Design: The Art of the Victoria and Albert Museum, London: V&A Publications.
Blume, Dieter. 1987. "Anticos Antike", in Städel-Jahrbuch II, pp. 179–204, esp. pp. 188–190, illus. 10 & 11.
Bober, P.P. & R.O. Rubinstein. 1986. Renaissance Artists and Antique Sculpture, a Handbook of Sources, Oxford, p. 144, fig. 112a.
Chambers, David & Jane Martineau (eds). 1981. Splendours of the Gonzaga: Catalogue, London: Victoria and Albert Museum IV.3.
Ebert-Schifferer, Sybille. 1985. Natur und Antike in der Renaissance, Frankfurt: Liebieghaus - Museum Alter Plastik.
Luciano, Eleanora (ed) in collaboration with Denise Allen and Claudia Kryza-Gersch. 2011. "Antico", in The Golden Age of Renaissance Bronzes, (exhibition catalogue, National Gallery of Art Washington 6 November 2011 – 8 April 2012; The Frick Collection, New York, 1 May-29 July 2012), London: Paul Holberton Publishing, inc. pp. 172, 192; pls 22 & 22a.
Pope-Hennessy, John Wyndham & Antonio Santangelo. 1961. Italian Bronze Statuettes, London: Arts Council no. 54.
Trevisani, Filippo & Davide Gasparotto (eds). 2008. Bonacolsi l'Antico: uno scultore nella Mantova di Andrea Mantegna e di Isabelle d'Este, Milano: Electa.
Williamson, Paul. 1986. "The NACF and the National Collection of Sculpture", in National Art-Collections Fund Review, pp. 80–81.
Williamson, Paul (ed). 1996. European Sculpture at the Victoria and Albert Museum, London: Victoria and Albert Museum, pp. 88–89.

External links
 V&A Collections description of Meleager.
 Conservation conditions needed for Meleager: clip from Secrets of the Museum.

Renaissance sculptures
Sculptures of the Victoria and Albert Museum
15th-century sculptures
Bronze sculptures in the United Kingdom
Mannerist sculptures